The Samuel Farkas House is a historic residence in Albany, Georgia. It was added to the National Register of Historic Places on November 9, 1977. It is located at 328 West Broad Avenue.

Samuel Farkas (October 25, 1921 - December 30, 2012) was a war hero in World War II and part of the family that operated the New Albany Hotel. He hired Ray Charles to give a performance on piano in the hotel's basement Continental Room.

See also
National Register of Historic Places listings in Dougherty County, Georgia

References

Houses on the National Register of Historic Places in Georgia (U.S. state)
Buildings and structures in Albany, Georgia
Houses in Dougherty County, Georgia
National Register of Historic Places in Dougherty County, Georgia